Dichromodes cynica is a moth of the family Geometridae. It is endemic to New Zealand.

References

Oenochrominae
Moths described in 1911
Moths of New Zealand
Endemic fauna of New Zealand
Taxa named by Edward Meyrick
Endemic moths of New Zealand